Aspilapteryx tringipennella is a moth of the family Gracillariidae. It is known from all of Europe.

The wingspan is 10–13 mm. Forewings pale greyish ochreous to light ochreous-yellow ; an ill-defined white costal streak from base to near apex ; subcostal and median longitudinal rows of black dots, and sometimes two or three on fold. Hindwings grey. 

There are two generations per year, with adults on wing in May and again in August.

The larvae feed on Plantago lanceolata and Plantago maritima. They mine the leaves of their host plant. The mine starts as a long, tortuous, lower-surface (but sometimes upper-surface) epidermal, silvery corridor. After a moult the larva works itself to the upper surface of the leaf and begins to make a blotch and soon after a tentiform mine running along the midrib. The mine contracts very strongly, causing the epidermis to develop strong folds, and the leaf to double, almost concealing the mine. Shortly before pupation the larva eats a window in the floor of the mine, leaving only the lower epidermis intact. The pupa is made in a white cocoon within the mine. After hibernation, the larvae generally leave the mine and start a new tentiform mine elsewhere

References

Aspilapteryx
Moths of Europe
Moths described in 1839